Stepanos Nazarian (in Tiflis – , in Moscow) was an Armenian-Russian publisher, enlightener, historian of literature and orientalist.

Biography 

He was born in the family of a priest. Graduated from the department of philosophy in the University of Tartu in 1840. In 1849 he became a professor of Persian and Arab literature in Moscow in the Lazarev Institute of Oriental Languages. He published a number of scholarly works and earned his doctoral dissertation on a work analyzing Ferdowsi's Shahnameh.

Under the influence of the European enlightenment movement and the Russian social movement of the 1840s, Nazarian increasingly began writing against the feudal system and its ideology. In the 1850s he became the leader of the Armenian enlightenment movement. Between 1858 and 1864 he published in Moscow the influential magazine Hyusisapayl (Aurora Borealis), that had a great effect on the development of progressive public thought in Armenia. He criticized serfdom and clerical power for the spiritual revival of the Armenian people; however, he refused to classify his actions as part of a broader class struggle. Nazarian advanced the idea of public education in the new enlightenment era as well as the replacement of Classical Armenian (grabar) with the new literary Ashkarhabar. He was a supporter of deism and promoted Russian and foreign literature. Translated many of Friedrich Schiller's dramas.

References
 Great Soviet Encyclopedia, 1974
 
 

1812 births
1879 deaths
Historians from the Russian Empire
Male writers from the Russian Empire
19th-century Armenian historians
Ethnic Armenian translators
Writers from Tbilisi
Armenian people from the Russian Empire
Armenian orientalists
19th-century translators
19th-century male writers from the Russian Empire